Kiakola is a city in Simorgh County, Mazandaran Province, Iran.

Kiakola or Kia Kola or Kiya Kola or Keya Kola or Kia Kala or Kiya Kala may also refer to various places in Iran:
 Kia Kola, Chalus
 Keya Kola, Nowshahr
 Kia Kola, Nur
 Kia Kola, Sari
 Kiakola District, former district in Simorgh County
 Kiakola Rural District, rural district in Simorgh County